Sir Colin Hugh Verel McColl,  (born 6 September 1932) was Head of the British Secret Intelligence Service (MI6) from 1989 to 1994.

Career
Educated at Shrewsbury School and at The Queen's College, Oxford, McColl joined the diplomatic service in 1950. He served in Laos, Vietnam, Warsaw and Geneva before he was appointed Chief of the Secret Intelligence Service in 1989. In retirement he was a Director of the Scottish American Investment Company.

In 1996 he was appointed an Honorary Fellow of The Queen's College, Oxford.

References

1932 births
Cold War spies
Knights Commander of the Order of St Michael and St George
Alumni of The Queen's College, Oxford
Fellows of The Queen's College, Oxford
Post–Cold War spies
Living people
People educated at Shrewsbury School
Chiefs of the Secret Intelligence Service